Benjamin S. Grossberg (born 1971) is an American poet and educator.

Career 
Grossberg is the director of creative writing at the University of Hartford and was a professor of literature and creative writing at Antioch College.  Until the 2022-2023 school year, he the advisor to the student run literary journal, Aerie. He was the winner of the Lambda Literary Award for Gay Poetry in 2009.

His poems have appeared in the Pushcart Prize and Best American Poetry anthologies, Poetry Daily and Verse Daily, and the magazines Paris Review, The Kenyon Review, Ploughshares, New England Review, Prairie Schooner, North American Review, and The Sun.

Awards and honors 
 2005 Pushcart Prize for "Beetle Orgy" 
 2007 Snyder Prize for Underwater Lengths in a Single Breath 
 2009 Lambda Literary Award for Gay Poetry for Sweet Core Orchard 
 2009 Tampa Review Prize for Sweet Core Orchard 
 2011 The Best American Poetry for "The Space Traveler Talks Frankly About Desire" 
 2016 Christopher Hewitt Award for “Days of 1993, ’94, ’95” 
 2016 Jacar Press Chapbook Competition for An Elegy 
 2020 Foreword Indies Book of the Year in Poetry (Silver) for My Husband Would 
 2021 Connecticut Book Award in poetry for My Husband Would

Grants and fellowships 
 1998 Cultural Arts Council of Houston Fellowship   
 2003 Ohio Arts Council Grant   
 2006 Culture Works of Montgomery County, Ohio Grant 
 2011 & 2018 Connecticut Office of the Arts Fellowship (2018 )

Works

Poetry collections 
 Underwater Lengths in a Single Breath (2007)    
 Sweet Core Orchard (2009)   
 Space Traveler (2014)   
 My Husband Would (2020)

Poetry chapbooks 
 The Auctioneer Bangs His Gavel (2006)   
 An Elegy (2017)

Editor 
 The Poetry of Capital: Voices from Twenty-first Century America (2021)

Essays 
 “Culture Club in Space: An Anecdotal Poetics” in Who's Yer Daddy?: Gay Writers Celebrate Their Mentors and Forerunners (2012) 
 “How to Put Words in Someone's Mouth: Teaching the Dramatic Monologue”, AWP: Magazine & Media, Association of Writers and Writers Programs, (July 2013)
 “Through Me”, Superstition Review, Arizona State University (12 December 2013)

Recordings 
 "Catherine The Great," The Common Magazine, Issue 17, April 15, 2019
 ”Heaven” & “The Space Traveler Talks Frankly About Desire,” The Brainwaves Video Anthology (2019)
 “In My 47th Year” and “Catawba,” Kenyon Review Out Loud (XLI Number 3, 2019) 
 Teachers Make a Difference - Ed Hirsch, The Brainwaves Video Anthology (2019)
 “The Space Traveler and Starlight,” Hartford Courant, September 20, 2018
 “The Space Traveler and Wandering,” on WNPR, Connecticut Public Radio's, Where We Live, June 3, 2014

References

External links 
 Grossberg's Bio on The Poetry Foundation  
 “I am first a creature of the imagination: An interview with Benjamin Grossberg,” Long River Review (2015)  
 “The 10 Questions for Benjamin S. Grossberg,” The Massachusetts Review (2018)  
 “Five Poets that Changed My Life,” Lambda Literary (2010)  
 Poems in The Yale Review (v107:2 2019) (v104:1 2016)  
 Poems in The Sun 
 Poems on Verse Daily

1971 births
Living people
20th-century American poets
21st-century American poets
American male poets
Rutgers University alumni
University of Houston alumni
American LGBT poets
Lambda Literary Award for Gay Poetry winners
20th-century American male writers
21st-century American male writers
21st-century LGBT people